Bret Morrison (5 May 1912 – 25 September 1978)  was an American actor best known as the voice of the mysterious crusader for law and order on radio's The Shadow.  He was also a popular cabaret singer.

Born in Chicago, Illinois, Morrison entered radio during the 1930s while he was still in Chicago High School. He began with The First Nighter Program. In 1937, he was in the cast of Lucky Girl, a Monday-Friday drama broadcast on WGN in Chicago.

Morrison portrayed the Shadow longer than any other actor, spending 10 years in the role in two separate runs. Bill Johnstone played the Shadow until early 1943. Morrison replaced Johnstone in April, 1943, continuing until 1944. John Archer (1944–45) was followed by Steve Courtleigh (1945). Morrison then returned from 1945 until 1954. For many, he was the definitive voice of the Shadow, though his delivery was much less sinister than Orson Welles, who also portrayed the Shadow during its first full year run.

Morrison's other roles in radio programs included those shown in the table below.

In 1974 Morrison was living in Palm Springs, California. At age 66, Morrison died of a heart attack. He was found slumped over the steering wheel of his parked car on a Hollywood street where he had stopped for shopping after taping an episode of Heartbeat Theater. It was believed 107-degree temperatures in a Southern California heat wave may have prompted Morrison's heart attack.

References

1912 births
1978 deaths
American male radio actors
American male voice actors
Male actors from Palm Springs, California
20th-century American male actors